Harpulina is a genus of sea snails, marine gastropod mollusks in the family Volutidae.

Distribution
Restricted to Sri Lanka and the southern tip of the Indian Peninsula

Species
Species within the genus Harpulina include:
 Harpulina arausiaca (Lightfoot, 1786)
 Harpulina diannae T. Cossignani, Allary & P. G. Stimpson, 2021
 Harpulina lapponica (Linnaeus, 1767)
 Harpulina stimpsonorum T. Cossignani & Allary, 2020
Species brought inro synonymy
 Harpulina harpa (Swainson, 1835): synonym of Lyria anna (Lesson, 1835) 
 Harpulina japonica Shikama & Horikoshi, 1963: synonym of Harpulina lapponica (Linnaeus, 1767)

References

 Bail P. & Poppe G.T. 2001. A conchological iconography: a taxonomic introduction of the recent Volutidae. ConchBooks, Hackenheim. 30 pp, 5 pl.

External links
 Dall W.H. (1906). Note on some names in the Volutidae. The Nautilus. 19(12): 143-144

Volutidae